Bobby Chacon (November 28, 1951 – September 7, 2016) was an American professional boxer who competed from 1972 to 1988. He held titles in two weight classes, including the WBC featherweight title from September 1974 to June 1975 and the WBC super featherweight title from December 1982 to June 1983.

Biography

Early career
Born in Pacoima, in the San Fernando Valley, Chacon who was of Mexican descent graduated from San Fernando High School and turned professional in 1972 while a student at California State University, Northridge, leading to the nickname "Schoolboy". He trained under Joe Ponce and won his first 19 fights, including a win against former champion Jesus Castillo. Fourteen months into his professional career, Chacon faced world champion Rubén Olivares but lost the bout when Olivares scored a ninth-round knock out. After suffering his first defeat against Olivares, Chacon won his next four bouts, then faced off against cross-town rival and future champion Danny Lopez. Chacon outboxed Lopez and stopped him in the ninth round in an exciting fight.

WBC Featherweight title
On September 7, 1974, Chacon won the vacant WBC Featherweight title by defeating former WBA Junior Lightweight champion Alfredo Marcano in nine rounds at the Grand Olympic Auditorium in Los Angeles. During his first period as a world champion, Chacon got to enjoy the good life, but he loved partying and became an alcoholic.

Chacon lost his title in his second defense against arch-rival Rubén Olivares. Almost immediately after the loss, he fought the first of his four fight rivalry with another world champion, Rafael "Bazooka" Limón, beginning what some boxing experts and historians called one of the fiercest and most spectacular boxing rivalries in history. Limón beat Chacon in their first bout by a decision. Chacon then scored nine straight wins, leading him to a third match with Olivares. This time, Chacon defeated Olivares in their 12-round bout by a decision. In Chacon's next fight, he lost an upset decision to Arturo Leon. Chacon rebounded by scoring victories over Ignacio Campos, Augie Pantellas, Gerald Hayes and Shig Fukuyama. He then fought to a technical draw in a rematch against Rafael Limón.

In November 1979, Chacon received a shot at the WBC title, versus world champion Alexis Argüello. Arguello defeated him by a devastating knock out after Chacon sustained a bad cut in the seventh round. In 1980, Chacon had only one fight, but it was a significant one. He beat Limón in their third bout, and the WBC once again made him their number one challenger. In 1981, Arguello had left the title vacant and gone up in weight to pursue the world's Lightweight title. Limón then beat Idelfonso Bethelmy by a knockout in 15 in Los Angeles to win the WBC world Jr. Lightweight championship. In his first title defense, he lost it by a decision to Uganda's Cornelius Boza-Edwards, who, in turn, defended his title against Chacon on his first defense. In a televised bout, Edwards retained the world title by a knockout in the thirteenth round.

Chacon won five fights in a row in 1982, including a rematch victory over Arturo Leon, which kept him as the number one challenger, but then a dramatic development outside the ring changed his life forever: Chacon's wife, Valorie Chacon, flew to Hawaii on February of that year, hoping to convince him to leave boxing and move there if she found them good jobs. She was able to find a job, but unable to convince him to join her in Hawaii, so she flew back. She pleaded for him to leave the sport but was unsuccessful, and the night before he boxed Salvador Ugalde, she shot and killed herself with a rifle. Chacon went through with the fight and KO'ed Ugalde in the third round. He dedicated his win to his deceased wife.

WBC Super featherweight title
Two more victories followed before his fourth and final bout with Limón. Limón had regained the world's Jr. Lightweight title by beating Rolando Navarrete by a knockout in 12 rounds. Navarrete, for his part, had won the title by beating Edwards by a knockout in five rounds. Chacon-Limón IV became one of the fights of the year and the decade, according to such magazines as The Ring, KO Magazine, and Ring En Español, and after 15 rounds Chacon secured a close decision and his second world title in Sacramento.

About one and a half years after his wife's suicide, Chacon remarried and bought a large farm with a mansion and, according to what he said at an interview, about 40 horses. He also acquired a collection of Rolls-Royce cars and some other vehicles. In between, he and Boza Edwards met for a second time, with his world title on the line, in what The Ring called 1983's fight of the year. Chacon rose from a knockdown in round three and recovered from a dangerous cut. The announcers, including Ferdie Pacheco, were explicit in saying the fight should be stopped because of the pounding Chacon endured. But Chacon came back to drop Boza Edwards in round twelve and avenge his earlier defeat to the Ugandan former champion. In 1983, Chacon was signed to defend his WBC title in that rematch against Boza Edwards, who was the WBC's mandatory challenger. Even though WBC rules stated the mandatory challenger should receive a shot at the title, the WBC insisted Chacon fight Héctor Camacho in Puerto Rico instead, then stripped him of his title when he refused.

Chacon started 1984 with a move up in weight, to the Lightweight division, where he tried to join the exclusive club of boxing's three division world champions, but was knocked out in three during his challenge against world champion Ray Mancini in Reno. Chacon then beat Carlton Sparrow by a TKO in five rounds and announced his retirement. Chacon came back in 1985 and he won five fights, including one against former world champion Arturo Frias by a knockout in seven, and a knockout in five over Rafael Solis, who had challenged Camacho for the world Jr. Lightweight title that had once belonged to Chacon. In 1987 and 1989 he won one fight each year. He retired in 1989 winning 14 out of his last 15 fights.

Later life and death
Chacon was placed on probation in 1984 for beating his second of three wives. His life was again marred by tragedy in 1991, when his son Bobby Jr. was killed in a gang slaying. In 1996, he was spotted at a public appearance in Phoenix, Arizona, to see the fight between Oscar De La Hoya and Julio César Chávez. By 2000 he had lost most of his savings and was being cared for by a nurse as he was impacted by dementia pugilistica (boxer's syndrome).  He died after falling while in hospice care for dementia on September 7, 2016. He was 64.

Honors and references
In 1982, he was named comeback fighter of the year by The Ring. His wins over Limon in 1982 and Edwards in 1983, were both named Ring Magazine fights of the year. In 2003, Chacon was included on The Rings list of "The 100 Greatest Punchers of All-Time". Chacon was inducted into the International Boxing Hall of Fame in January 2005; he was to be inducted into the West Boxing Hall of Fame later in September 2016.

The chorus of Warren Zevon's song "Boom Boom Mancini", from his 1987 album Sentimental Hygiene, makes reference to Chacon's fight with Mancini three years earlier. Chacon died thirteen years to the day after Zevon.

Professional boxing record

See also 
 Bobby Chacon vs. Rafael Limón 
 List of Mexican boxing world champions
 List of WBC world champions

References

External links 
 
 Bobby Chacon's Boxing Hall of Fame Page

|-

|-

1951 births
2016 deaths
American boxers of Mexican descent
Boxers from California
World boxing champions
People from Pacoima, Los Angeles
San Fernando High School alumni
International Boxing Hall of Fame inductees
American male boxers
Super-featherweight boxers
Accidental deaths from falls
Accidental deaths in California
People with dementia
Sportspeople with chronic traumatic encephalopathy